Rushton can refer to the following:

People with the surname
 Dave Rushton (born 1973), English footballer
 Herbert J. Rushton (1877–1947), American politician
 J. Philippe Rushton (1943–2012), Anglo-Canadian psychology professor
 Julian Rushton (born 1941), English musicologist
 Michael Rushton, English blues-rock and indie drummer
 Tim Rushton, choreographer and artist director of the Danish Dance Theatre, Copenhagen
 W. A. H. Rushton, physiology professor in Cambridge and former president of the Society for Psychical Research
 Walter Rushton, English footballer
 Willie Rushton, William George Rushton, English cartoonist, satirist, comedian, actor and performer

Places
 Rushton, Cheshire
 Rushton, Northamptonshire
 Rushton, Staffordshire
 Rushton Triangular Lodge
 Rushton Park, Mandurah
 Tarrant Rushton

Other
Rushton Hall, home of James John Van Alen, in Rushton, Northamptonshire, England
Rushton turbine, agitator designed for gas dispersion and high shear mixing
Rushton, an American toy company that made stuffed toys

See also
Rushden (disambiguation) 

English-language surnames
English toponymic surnames